Marcellin "Marcel" Cerdan (22 July 1916 – 28 October 1949) was a French professional boxer and world middleweight champion who was considered by many boxing experts and fans to be France's greatest boxer, and beyond to be one of the best to have learned his craft in Africa. His life was marked by his sporting achievements, social lifestyle and ultimately, tragedy, being killed in an airplane crash.

Early life 
Marcellin Cerdan was born at 9:00pm on 22 July 1916 in the "Little Paris" neighbourhood of Sidi Bel Abbès in Algeria. He was the fourth son of Antonio Cerdán (1880–1946), a day labourer, and Asunción Cascales (1886–1942), pied-noirs of Spanish origin.

Boxing career

Cerdan began boxing professionally on 4 November 1934 in Meknes, Morocco, beating Marcel Bucchianeri by a decision in six rounds. He then ran a streak of 47 wins in a row between that first bout and 4 January 1939, when he lost for the first time, to Harry Craster by a disqualification in five rounds in London. Cerdan campaigned heavily in the French territories of Algeria and Morocco during that part of his career, as well as in metropolitan France. In 1938, he beat Omar Kouidri in a 12-round decision at Casablanca to claim the French welterweight title.

After his first loss, Cerdan recorded five consecutive wins, which led him to challenge Saviello Turiello for Europe's welterweight title in Milan, Italy. He won the European title by a decision in 15 rounds to continue his ascent towards the championship (back then, it was considered essential to own at least a Continental title belt to earn a world title shot; nowadays, it is not considered as important).

Cerdan's winning streak eventually reached 23 bouts before he suffered a defeat to Victor Buttin by disqualification for a second time, in eight rounds in Algiers in 1942. They would later re-match in 1945, and Cerdan would avenge the defeat by knocking Buttin out in the third round.

For his next bout after the first fight with Buttin though, Cerdan put his title on the line against José Ferrer (namesake of the Hollywood star). He knocked out Ferrer in one round, and won four more bouts in a row before facing another boxer with a namesake: James Toney, who shared that name with another boxer who would become world Middleweight champion five decades later. Cerdan knocked out Toney in two rounds to keep this new winning streak alive. The new streak would reach 37 wins. In between, he joined the American allies in World War II during 1944, and he won the Inter-Allied Championship.

He also went up in weight to the Middleweight division, and won the French title by beating Assane Douf by a knockout in three rounds. He later claimed the vacant European title by beating Léon Foquet by a knockout in one round. He retained that title a couple of times before losing it to rugged Belgian Cyrille Delannoit by a decision in 15 at Brussels, Belgium. Soon, he went back to Belgium and re-took the title by beating Delannoit, also by decision.

Finally, after the rematch with Delannoit, Cerdan was given a world title opportunity and he travelled to the United States, where he beat World Middleweight champion Tony Zale. Cerdan became a world champion by knocking Zale out in the 12th round in Roosevelt Stadium, Jersey City, New Jersey on 21 September 1948.

Death and fame
During his short period as a world champion, Cerdan became a popular figure of the Paris scene. Although married with three children, he had an affair with the famous singer Édith Piaf. The affair lasted from summer 1948 until his death in autumn 1949. They were very devoted to each other and Piaf dedicated one of her most famous songs, Hymne à l'amour, to Cerdan.

For his first defense Cerdan returned to the United States, where he fought Jake LaMotta in Detroit. Cerdan was knocked down in round one, his shoulder was dislocated, and he had to give up after the tenth round. It would be the last fight of Cerdan's life.  A contract was signed for a rematch and Cerdan went to training camp for it, but before camp began he boarded an Air France flight to visit Piaf in New York, where she was singing. The  Lockheed L-749 Constellation crashed into Monte Redondo (São Miguel Island, Azores), killing all 11 crew members and 37 passengers on board, including Cerdan and the famous French violinist Ginette Neveu, while approaching the intermediate stop airport at Santa Maria. The following day, LaMotta lauded Cerdan's sportsmanship, saying: "You had to fight him as I did to know what a fine sportsman he was." Cerdan was interred in the Cimetière du Sud, Perpignan, Pyrénées-Orientales, France.

Legacy
Cerdan's record was 110 wins and 4 losses, with 65 wins by knockout.

He is a member, along with LaMotta and Zale, of the International Boxing Hall of Fame.

In 1983, Cerdan and Piaf had their lives turned into a big screen biography by Claude Lelouch. The film, Édith et Marcel, starred Marcel Cerdan, Jr. in the role of his father and Évelyne Bouix as Piaf.  He is portrayed by actor Jean-Pierre Martins in the 2007 Piaf biopic La Môme (entitled La Vie en Rose in English-speaking countries).

In 1991, a sports arena located in Levallois-Perret, the Palais des sports Marcel-Cerdan, was named in his honor.

Professional boxing record

See also
 List of middleweight boxing champions

References

External links

 Marcel Cerdan Official website, created by Nicolas Cerdan, his grandson  
 Marcel Cerdan Heritage – Vintage Sportswear (Eng/Fr), created by Nicolas Cerdan, his grandson
 IBHOF.com International Boxing Hall of Fame Homepage
 
 
 Here's Looking At You, Casablanca: Marcel Cerdan

1916 births
1949 deaths
People from Sidi Bel Abbès
Pieds-Noirs
French male boxers
International Boxing Hall of Fame inductees
Middleweight boxers
Victims of aviation accidents or incidents in Portugal
Welterweight boxers
World boxing champions
Free French military personnel of World War II
Victims of aviation accidents or incidents in 1949